Saïd Amara Stadium is a multi-use stadium in Saida, Algeria.  It is currently used mostly for football matches.  The stadium holds 35,000 people.

History
It was named the 13 April 1958 Stadium, to celebrate the date of the creation of the FLN team. In 2020, when Saïd Amara died, LFP proposed that the stadium bear his name.

References

External links
 Stade 13 Avril 1958 - goalzz.com

Saïd Amara Stadium
Buildings and structures in Saïda Province